Wedding Palace (Civil State Registration Department). It was completed in 1988 as a Modernist, Soviet architecture, former USSR by the architect, Vyacheslav Pavlyukov.

Description
It is located in Vulytsya Pushkina, nearby Red Bridge, not far from the square of Bohdan Khmelnytsky Square and Krasna Square. There are three floors, on the first floor there are offices of various services, two small rooms and a lecture hall. On the second floor there are two preparation rooms for young people and witnesses, as well as office rooms and on the third floor there are two halls for ceremonies in blue and pink (there is a superstition that the color of the hall affects the gender of the first child, and there should be many children).

History
The Wedding Palace, in the city of Chernihiv, in Ukraine,  was designed by the architect, Vyacheslav Pavlyukov during the Soviet era; it was inaugurated in 1988. In May 2021, in the city of Chernihiv, they started discussing the renovation of the RATSUFOTO building. The option of holding all wedding ceremonies is not considered in the registry office, but in the city palace of culture. The mayor of Chernihiv Vladyslav Atroshenko stated at a meeting that the renovation depends on the City Council with the project will consist in three-star hotel and conference halls. In 2021 a statistic state that a thousand couples in Chernihiv have already officially confirmed their relationship during the year. From the testimonies of many spouses, recalled that thanks to the modern approach to the registration of civil status acts, the Ministry of Justice creates all the necessary conditions for quick and convenient access to services.

General Data
The Wedding Palace is open Tuesday to Friday from 8m to 12pm and 12:45 to 5-15pm. Saturday the place is open from 8m to 12pm and 12:45 to 4-15pm and on Sunday from 10am until 5pm. On Monday is closed.

Gallery

References

External links 
 Website
 wikimapia.org

Tourist attractions in Chernihiv
Tourist attractions in Chernihiv Oblast
Buildings and structures in Chernihiv
Architecture in the Soviet Union
Tourism in Chernihiv